Dwight D. Eisenhower Park is a park located in Harris County, Texas on the south coast of Lake Houston

It is owned and managed by Harris County Precinct One, which acquired the park from the City of Houston in 1995.

Recreation
The park is popular for fishing, especially for rainbow trout. There are picnic areas, a playground, and nature trails.

Location

References

Parks in Houston
Protected areas of Harris County, Texas